It's All Dubstep is the second remix release by Iwrestledabearonce. The EP was released on November 8, 2010 as a free download. The EP features five dubstep remixes of four different songs from their album, It's All Happening. It was released for free Digital Download via the band's Facebook page.

Track listing

References

2010 remix albums
Iwrestledabearonce albums
Century Media Records compilation albums
Dubstep albums